Facing Ali is a 2002 book authored by Stephen Brunt; it is about fifteen different fighters from around the world who battled with Muhammad Ali in boxing fights. In each chapter of the book, one of the selected fighters recalls the experience of fighting with Ali. The profiled fighters include Ali's famous opponents like George Foreman, Joe Frazier, Larry Holmes, and Ken Norton; and also the relatively obscure like the German butcher Jurgen Blin who "was back at work at the sausage factory" after having fought with Ali the previous day. Other fighters profiled in the book include Tunney Hunsaker, Jean Pierre Coopman, Henry Cooper, Ron Lyle, Chuck Wepner, and George Chuvalo.

According to the Houston Chronicle:

References

Books about Muhammad Ali
Biographies about African-American people
2002 non-fiction books
Knopf Canada books
Lyons Press books